Lieutenant General GAV Reddy, AVSM, SC, VSM is a serving general officer of the Indian Army. He currently serves as the Director General of Defence Intelligence Agency (India). 

He earlier served as the Commandant of the Officers Training Academy Gaya. As a major general, Reddy as the Inspector General Assam Rifles (East) (IGAR East), at Silchar.

He is an alumnus of Officers training academy Chennai and was commissioned into the Jat Regiment on 8 March 1986.

References 

Living people
Year of birth missing (living people)
Indian military personnel
Indian generals
Indian intelligence agencies
Recipients of the Ati Vishisht Seva Medal
Recipients of the Shaurya Chakra
Recipients of the Vishisht Seva Medal
Defence Services Staff College alumni
Army War College, Mhow alumni
National Defence College, India alumni